The C. J. Simpson Drilling Company was an oil company active in the 1950s in the United States and Cuba. Its activities included buying a 7,150-barrel Olean, New York oil refinery from Socony-Vacuum Oil Company in 1954 and moving it to Cuba. In 1959 it signed a $10m contract with YPF of Argentina to drill 300 oil wells.

References

Defunct oil companies of the United States
Oil and gas companies of Cuba